The Journal of Product Innovation Management is a bimonthly peer-reviewed academic journal published by Wiley-Blackwell on behalf of the Product Development and Management Association. The current editors-in-chief are Jelena Spanjol (Ludwig-Maximilians-Universität) and Charles H. Noble (University of Tennessee).

According to the Journal Citation Reports, the journal has a 2020 impact factor of 6.98, ranking it 8th out of 49 journals in the category "Engineering, Industrial", 35th out of 153 journals in the category "Business", and 43th out of 226 journals in the category "Management".

The journal received an "A" ranking as a marketing journal by 1100 business scholars in Germany, Austria, and Switzerland.

In 2022 the Journal received in access of 800 manuscripts, desk rejected 59% of submissions, and Accepted 5-8%%  of the submissions. The top 10 countries submitting papers were: USA (15.5%), UK (11.5%), Germany (9.3%), China (8.1%), Taiwan (7.6%), India (4.9%), Spain and Italy (3.8%), The Netherlands (3.2%), and France (3%).

Controversy

In 2012, the journal published a study that ranked the Henry W. Bloch School of Management (University of Missouri-Kansas City) number 1 in the world for research in innovation management. However, the methodology of the study and the independence of its authors was questioned. In March, 2015, the journal published an "expression of concern" regarding the study. However, four independent scholars had later reviewed the article and found its methodology to be acceptable.

References

External links
 

Wiley-Blackwell academic journals
Business and management journals
Bimonthly journals
Publications established in 1984
English-language journals